Sanchai Ratiwatana and Sonchat Ratiwatana were the defending champions, but they lost to Victor Baluda and Dino Marcan in the first round.
Baluda and Marcan defeated Samuel Groth and John-Patrick Smith 6–7(5–7), 6–4, [10–7] in the final to win the title.

Seeds

Draw

Draw

References
 Main Draw

ATP China International Tennis Challenge – Anning - Doubles
2013 Doubles